Mordechai Avniel (1900–1989), variant name Mordecai Avniel, was an Israeli painter, sculptor and lawyer.

Biography 
Mordecai Dickstein (later Avniel) was born in 1900 in Parychy, in the Minsk Governorate of the Russian Empire (present-day Belarus). He studied fine arts in Yekaterinburg, Russia (1913–19) and at the Bezalel Academy of Art and Design, Jerusalem (1923). Avniel immigrated to Palestine in 1921 where he first worked as a pioneer in citrus plantations near Petah Tikva. In 1923, at the urging of Boris Schatz, he went to Jerusalem to further his art studies at Bezalel. He later taught painting and sculpture at the school, and served a term as director of the Small Sculpture Section of the Sculpture Department (1924–28).
From 1935 on, Avniel lived in Haifa. Avniel was also a lawyer and a founding partner of the Haifa firm Avniel, Salomon & Company.

Art career
Avniel regularly showed his work in  group exhibitions of the Painters and Sculptors' Association of Israel.  He was awarded the Herman Struck Prize (1952), Tenth Anniversary Prize for Watercolours, Ramat Gan (1958), Histadrut Prize (1961), and First Prize Haifa Municipality (1977). He represented Israel at the 1958 Venice Biennale and the 1962 International Art Seminar at Fairleigh Dickinson University. Avniel was a member of the Artists' Colony in Safed and maintained a studio on Mount Carmel.

Artistic style
Avniel is best known for his landscape paintings. He said of his scenes of Israel: "I loved the Israeli landscape. While roaming the country extensively, I gradually absorbed its atmosphere, its lights and moods, the view of mountains and valleys, the Sea of Galilee and the expanse of the Mediterranean. Again and again, I experimented painting and drawing them, at the same time trying to teach myself contemporary art. And thus I gradually shook off the academic conception, and became freer. I tried with my whole being to find my own style. The clouds floating above the Galilee or the Dead Sea - both below sea level - bring about an almost constant change of light, colour and atmosphere. The scenery takes on certain shapes and discards them again. These clouds taught me to understand space. I do not see my landscapes optically; they are a fusion of colours blended harmoniously - abstract at times, and at other times expressions of my inner feelings. Only after years did I find self-expression in my landscape, in the light, the atmosphere and the sun of Israel. My motif is always the non-static landscape with all its contrasts: the rays of dawn, the stillness of the day's heat, the evening's twilight, radiance and dimness, wind and rain, a night's storm."

Avniel's manipulations of light and colour share much with those of compatriot artists Shimshon Holzman and Joseph Kossonogi.

Selected exhibitions 
 2004: Our Landscape: Notes on Landscape Painting in Israel, University of Haifa Art Gallery, Haifa (online catalogue)
 1965: Mordechai Avniel Retrospective, Haifa Municipality Museum of Modern Art, Haifa
 1964: Galerie Synthèse, Paris
 1962: New York University, New York
 1961: Rina Gallery of Modern Art, Jerusalem
 1960: Galerie Intime, Montréal
 1959: Opening Show, Gallery Moos, Toronto (with Pablo Picasso, Serge Poliakoff, Marc Chagall, Hans Erni and Paul-Émile Borduas) (1959 gallery invitation).
 1959: Pulitzer Art Galleries, New York
 1957: Chemerinsky Gallery, Tel Aviv
 1956: Museum of Modern Art, Haifa
 1955: Nora Gallery, Jerusalem
 1954: Tel Aviv Museum, Tel Aviv
 1954: National Museum, Washington
 1953: Shore Gallery, Boston
 1952: Katz Gallery, Tel Aviv
 1941: Beit Pevsner, Haifa

Selected collections 
 Haifa museum of Art
 Tel Aviv Museum
 Israel Museum, Jerusalem
 Boston Public Library
 Brooklyn Museum
 Fogg Art Museum, Cambridge
 Hartford Atheneum
 Metropolitan Museum of Art, New York
 Museum of Fine Arts, Boston
 Museum of Modern Art, New York
 Smithsonian Institution, Washington DC
 New York Public Library
 Philadelphia Museum of Art
 Baltimore Museum of Art
 Carnegie Institute of Fine Arts, Pittsburgh
 Fine Arts Museums of San Francisco

References

Catalogues
 Ayal, Avishay, and Yoram Bar-Gal. Our Landscape: Notes on Landscape Painting in Israel [exhibition catalogue]. Haifa: University of Haifa Art Gallery, 2004.
 Jaffé, Hans Ludwig. Sea of Galilee: Watercolors [portfolio of colour plates]. Tel Aviv: M. Avniel, 1963.
 Mordechai Avniel: The Israeli Landscape Painter [catalogue]. Tel Aviv: United Artists, [1966].
 Mordecai Avniel: Retrospective Exhibition, November–December 1965 [exhibition catalogue]. Haifa: Museum of Modern Art, 1965.
 Tadmor, Gabriel (ed). Mordecai Avniel: Paintings, Woodcuts, Small Sculptures [portfolio]. Haifa: M. Avniel, [197-?].
 Twelve Israeli Painters [portfolio of colour plates]. Tel Aviv: Lion Printers, 1965.

External links 
 Israeli Art Centre (Israel Museum, Jerusalem - Mordechai Avniel)
 Fine Arts Museums of San Francisco (collection of woodcuts and etchings)
 Selected works can be viewed here.

1900 births
1989 deaths
People from Svietlahorsk District
People from Bobruysky Uyezd
Belarusian Jews
Jews from the Russian Empire
Soviet Jews
Soviet emigrants to Mandatory Palestine
Jews in Mandatory Palestine
Israeli people of Belarusian-Jewish descent
Jewish painters
Israeli male painters
Jewish Israeli artists
20th-century Russian painters
Russian male painters
20th-century Israeli sculptors
20th-century Israeli male artists
Bezalel Academy of Arts and Design alumni
20th-century Russian male artists